The 12391/12392 Shramjeevi Superfast Express is a daily superfast express train of Indian Railways, running between Rajgir, near Nalanda, Bihar, and New Delhi, the capital city of India. Previously it was running between Patna and New Delhi, later extended to Rajgir.
This is the fastest train (12392) between Ghaziabad and Moradabad covers journey only in 2 hours
The name Shramjeevi signifies the employee/worker, dependent on physical/mental labour (Shram) for their livelihood (Jeevi).

History
 The train was first introduced between Patna Junction (PNBE) and New Delhi (NDLS) on 2 October 1991 (Gandhi Jayanti).
 Later Nalanda Express run in between Rajgir (RGD) and New Delhi (NDLS), which use to attach/detach with Shramjeevi Express at Patna Junction.
 Now whole rake runs between Rajgir (RGD) and New Delhi (NDLS), as Shramjeevi Express.
 Earlier the train belonged to Northern Railway with serial no as 2401/2402, now Rake belongs to East Central Railway, with serial number exchanged with Magadh Express.
 One of the few Indian Railways train used to be hauled by twin WDM-2 loco, now been replaced by WAP-4 or WAP-7.

Numbers & times

 Train No. 12391 departs from Rajgir daily at 08:00 AM to arrive New Delhi at 04:45 AM next day; covering 1103 km in 20 hrs and 45 minutes
 Train No. 12392 departs from New Delhi daily at 01:10 PM to arrive Rajgir at 10:30 AM next day; covering 1103 km in 21:20 hrs

Route & Halts
The train runs from Rajgir via Nalanda, Bakhtiyarpur Junction, Patna Sahib, Patna Junction, Danapur, Ara, Buxar, Dumraon, Pt. Deen Dayal Upadhyay Junction, Varanasi, Sultanpur, Lucknow Charbagh, Shahjahanpur, Bareilly, Moradabad, Ghaziabad to New Delhi.

Coach composition
The train generally consists of a total number of 22 LHB coach as follows:
 1 AC First Class
 2 AC II Tier
 6 AC III Tier
 1 Pantry Car
 6 Sleeper Class
 4 General Compartment
 1 EoG cum Brake/Luggage van
 1 SLR

Traction
Both trains are hauled by a Ghaziabad Loco Shed based WAP-7 electric locomotive from end to end.

See also
 Dibrugarh Rajdhani Express
 Jaisalmer–Howrah Superfast Express
Sampoorna Kranti Express

References

External links
 IndiaRailInfo.com: Shramjeevi Express/12391
 IndiaRailInfo.com: Shramjeevi Express/12392
 RunningStatus.in Shramjeevi Express (12391) - Up
 RunningStatus.in Shramjeevi Express (12392) - Down

Express trains in India
Rail transport in Bihar
Rail transport in Uttar Pradesh
Rail transport in Delhi
Railway services introduced in 1991
Transport in Delhi
Transport in Rajgir